Sarah Jane Hazlegrove (born 17 July 1968) is an English actress, known for portraying the role of Kathleen "Dixie" Dixon in the BBC medical drama Casualty. She has also appeared as Rosie in Making Out, Rosemary Mason in Silent Witness, Yvonne Bradley in London's Burning, and roles in Jonathan Creek, The Bill, Doctors, Families, Lovejoy, Coronation Street, and Holby City.

A lesbian whose character in Casualty is also gay, Hazlegrove was listed as one of the 100 most influential LGBT people of the year in 2012's World Pride Power List. Hazlegrove is married to actress Isobel Middleton.

On 30 January 2016, Hazlegrove left Casualty after playing the role of Dixie for 10 years. She reprised the role of Dixie in a guest appearance as a Hems paramedic on 7 September 2019. 

She appeared at the Royal Exchange, Manchester in Queens of the Coal Age, written by Maxine Peake. On 1 May 2019, it was announced that Hazlegrove had joined the cast of Coronation Street as Bernie Winter, the mother of established characters Gemma Winter and Paul Foreman. 

In 2019 Hazlegrove also played PO Janine Dolan in the 5Star prison drama Clink.

Filmography

Film

Television

References

External links
 

1968 births
Living people
English lesbian actresses
English television actresses
English soap opera actresses
Actresses from Manchester
English LGBT actors
20th-century English LGBT people
21st-century English LGBT people